Selvan a/l Anbualagan (born 5 November 2000) is a Malaysian footballer who plays as a midfielder for Malaysia Super League side Negeri Sembilan FC and Malaysia U-23.

Club career

Negeri Sembilan
He started his football career for the senior team in 2020 after being promoted to the Negeri Sembilan FC first team.

on 16 July 2022, he scored the only goal for Negeri Sembilan FC in a friendly against Buriram United. The Asean Charity Shield 2022 match was held at the Rainbow Stadium, Pattani. The single goal could not help Negeri Sembilan FC after the full result ended with 2-1 in favor of Buriram United.

He has been with the Negeri Sembilan FC team for three years and has made 46 appearances and scored 1 goal.

International career 
A. Selvan made his debut with the national U-23 squad during the qualifying match AFF U-23 Championship against Laos U-23 on February 8, 2022. Selvan managed to score his debut goal with the U-23 squad on (45 +1') extra time. However, the goal did not help the national under-21 squad when Laos managed to get 2 goals in the second half. The match ended with a 2-1 result.

References

External link

Selvan at flashscore.com.my

Living people
2000 births
People from Negeri Sembilan
Malaysian footballers
Negeri Sembilan FC players
Association football midfielders
Malaysia Super League players
Malaysian people of Tamil descent
Malaysian sportspeople of Indian descent